Two ships of the Royal Navy have been named HMS Sunflower:

  was an  launched in 1915 and sold in 1921
 

Royal Navy ship names